Orlando Luis Garcia (born November 18, 1952) is a United States district judge of the United States District Court for the Western District of Texas and former Texas state legislator.

Education and career

Born in Jim Wells County, Texas, Garcia received a Bachelor of Arts degree from the University of Texas at Austin in 1975 and a Juris Doctor from the University of Texas School of Law in 1978. He was in private practice in San Antonio, Texas from 1978 to 1990, and a Texas state representative from 1983 to 1991. From 1991 to 1992 he was a judge of the Texas Fourth Court of Appeals.

Federal judicial service
He was nominated by President Bill Clinton on November 19, 1993, to a seat which had been vacated by Emilio M. Garza over two years before. Garcia was confirmed by the United States Senate on March 10, 1994, and received his commission on March 11, 1994. He became chief judge on January 1, 2016 and served until November 18, 2022, when he turned 70 years old.

On February 26, 2014, in San Antonio, Garcia overturned the Texas ban on same-sex marriage, ruling that the prohibition is unconstitutional and stigmatizes the relationship of gay couples in the conservative state. He stayed his ruling pending appeal.

In August 2017, Garcia granted a preliminary injunction against Texas Senate Bill 4, which imposed prohibitions against certain local policies relating to immigration. That injunction was reversed in part by the United States Court of Appeals for the Fifth Circuit in May 2018.

See also
List of Hispanic/Latino American jurists

References

Sources

1952 births
Living people
20th-century American judges
21st-century American judges
Hispanic and Latino American judges
Hispanic and Latino American state legislators in Texas
Judges of the United States District Court for the Western District of Texas
Members of the Texas House of Representatives
People from Jim Wells County, Texas
Texas Democrats
United States district court judges appointed by Bill Clinton
University of Texas School of Law alumni